Refiloe Nt'sekhe (born 28 April 1977) is a South African politician who serves as a Deputy Federal Chairperson of the Democratic Alliance (DA). She was elected to the position at the 2015 Federal Congress. Nt'sekhe was elected as a Member of the Gauteng Provincial Legislature in the 2014 general election. She was also one of two national spokespeople of the DA from 2015 to 2020.

Early life and career
Nt'sekhe was born on 28 April 1977. She obtained a degree in politics and philosophy at the University of Cape Town. She later achieved a post-graduate degree in marketing from the same university. During her student years in the 1990s, she became a member of the South African Liberal Students Association (SALSA). She joined the DA in 2001.

Nt'sekhe worked for the Foschini Group, Capespan, South African Airways, Absa Group Limited and the South African Broadcasting Corporation, before becoming active in politics.

Political career
In 2009, she was appointed the DA's national director at the LEAD programme. She was elected the ward councillor for ward 24 of the City of Ekurhuleni Metropolitan Municipality in the 2011 municipal election. The party's branch in Tembisa soon elected her as constituency head. The following year, the DA named her its provincial spokesperson in Gauteng.

Prior to the 2014 general election, Nt'sekhe's name appeared on the DA's candidate list for the Gauteng Provincial Legislature. She was elected and took office as an MPL on 21 May 2014. In November 2014, she challenged incumbent John Moodey for Gauteng DA provincial leader. Moodey won the election. At the 2015 Democratic Alliance Federal Congress, she was elected as one of three Deputy Federal Chairpersons. Nt'sekhe was also appointed the DA's national spokesperson in July 2015 following the resignation of Marius Redelinghuys. She served alongside Phumzile van Damme until Van Damme resigned in February 2018 and was replaced by Solly Malatsi in June.

At the party's elective conference in 2018, she won another term as a Deputy Federal Chairperson. She was re-elected as an MPL in the 2019 general election. Nt'sekhe is currently the party's Shadow MEC for Social Development.

Nt'sekhe was re-elected as the first DA deputy federal chairperson at the party's Federal Congress held between 31 October and 1 November 2020. She now serves alongside Jacques Smalle and Anton Bredell. On 24 November 2020, Siviwe Gwarube was announced as the new national spokesperson of the DA.

2021 mayoral candidacy 
On 23 August 2021, DA leader John Steenhuisen announced Nt'sekhe as the DA's mayoral candidate for the City of Ekurhuleni in the 2021 local government elections. In the local government election of 1 November 2021, no party obtained a majority in Ekurhuleni city council. The DA finished second again with 28.72% of the vote, behind the ruling African National Congress's 38.19%. The DA Gauteng leadership then encouraged her to resign as the DA's mayoral candidate and as an incoming councillor, because it seemed unlikely that she would be elected mayor since the DA decided against working with the ANC or the Economic Freedom Fighters, the kingmakers in council. At the inaugural council meeting on 22 November, the DA's Ekurhuleni caucus leader, Tania Campbell, was unexpectedly elected as Executive Mayor with the help of the EFF and smaller parties. Nt'sekhe described Campbell's election as a "bittersweet moment" for her because the ANC was unseated from power.

Personal life
Nt'sekhe was married and has three children.

References

External links
Refiloe Nt'sekhe – People's Assembly
WATCH: Women in politics: The DA's Refiloe Ntsekhe – Eyewitness News

Living people
1977 births
People from Gauteng
University of Cape Town alumni
Democratic Alliance (South Africa) politicians
South African women in politics
Members of the Gauteng Provincial Legislature
Women members of provincial legislatures of South Africa
People from Tembisa
Politicians from Gauteng